In systems theory, a linear system is a mathematical model of a system based on the use of a linear operator.
Linear systems typically exhibit features and properties that are much simpler than the nonlinear case.
As a mathematical abstraction or idealization, linear systems find important applications in automatic control theory, signal processing, and telecommunications. For example, the propagation medium for wireless communication systems can often be
modeled by linear systems.

Definition

A system is linear if and only if it satisfies the superposition principle, or equivalently both the additivity and homogeneity properties, without restrictions (that is, for all inputs, all scaling constants and all time.)

The superposition principle means that a linear combination of inputs to the system produces a linear combination of the individual zero-state outputs (that is, outputs setting the initial conditions to zero) corresponding to the individual inputs.

In a system that satisfies the homogeneity property, scaling the input always results in scaling the zero-state response by the same factor. In a system that satisfies the additivity property, adding two inputs always results in adding the corresponding two zero-state responses due to the individual inputs.

Mathematically, for a continuous-time system, given two arbitrary inputs

as well as their respective zero-state outputs

then a linear system must satisfy

Given  and  the system can be solved for 

The behavior of the resulting system subjected to a complex input can be described as a sum of responses to simpler inputs.  In nonlinear systems, there is no such relation.  
This mathematical property makes the solution of modelling equations simpler than many nonlinear systems.
For time-invariant systems this is the basis of the impulse response or the frequency response methods (see LTI system theory), which describe a general input function  in terms of unit impulses or frequency components.  

Typical differential equations of linear time-invariant systems are well adapted to analysis using the Laplace transform in the continuous case, and the Z-transform in the discrete case (especially in computer implementations).

Another perspective is that solutions to linear systems comprise a system of functions which act like vectors in the geometric sense.

A common use of linear models is to describe a nonlinear system by linearization.  This is usually done for mathematical convenience.

The previous definition of a linear system is applicable to SISO (single-input single-output) systems. For MIMO (multiple-input multiple-output) systems, input and output signal vectors are considered instead of input and output signals (.)

This definition of a linear system is analogous to the definition of a linear differential equation in calculus, and a linear transformation in linear algebra.

Examples
A simple harmonic oscillator obeys the differential equation:

If 
then  is a linear operator.

The output versus input graph of a linear system need not be a straight line through the origin. It is linear because it satisfies the superposition principle. However, when the input is a sinusoid, the output is also a sinusoid, and so its output-input plot is an ellipse centered at the origin rather than a straight line passing through the origin.

Also, the output of a linear system can contain harmonics (and have a smaller fundamental frequency than the input) even when the input is a sinusoid. It is linear because it satisfies the superposition principle.

Time-varying impulse response
The time-varying impulse response  of a linear system is defined as the response of the system at time t = t2 to a single impulse applied at time   In other words, if the input  to a linear system is 

where  represents the Dirac delta function, and the corresponding response  of the system is

then the function  is the time-varying impulse response of the system. Since the system cannot respond before the input is applied the following causality condition must be satisfied:

The convolution integral

The output of any general continuous-time linear system is related to the input by an integral which may be written over a doubly infinite range because of the causality condition:

By redefinition of  it is then possible to write the input-output relation equivalently in any of the ways,

Linear time-invariant systems are most commonly characterized by the Laplace transform of the impulse response function called  the transfer function which is:

Because  is zero for negative , the integral may  equally be written over the doubly infinite range and putting  follows the formula for the frequency response function:

Discrete-time systems
The output of any discrete time linear system is related to the input by the time-varying convolution sum:

or equivalently for a time-invariant system on redefining ,

where  represents the lag time between the stimulus at time m and the response at time n.

See also
Shift invariant system
Linear control
Linear time-invariant system
Nonlinear system
System analysis
System of linear equations

Systems theory
Dynamical systems
Mathematical modeling
Concepts in physics

References